Brad Blackwood is an American audio mastering engineer. He has mastered albums for artists such as Maroon 5, Against Me!, Lamb of God, Black Eyed Peas, Sara Bareilles, and is a 17 time Grammy nominee and 3-time winner, as well as having multiple nominations and awards including Latin Grammy, Pensado Awards, Juno Awards and Dove Awards. He opened Euphonic Masters, his personal mastering room in Memphis, Tennessee in 2003. He is a graduate of Full Sail University (Recording Arts, 1996).

Work

Grammy awards

|-
|1999
|Choose Life
|Best Rock Gospel Album
|
|-
|2000
|Amplifier
|Best Rock Gospel Album
|
|-
|rowspan="2"|2001
|Shake Hands with Shorty
|Best Contemporary Blues Album
|
|-
|Third Verse
|Best Rock Gospel Album
|
|-
|2001
|Big Tent Revival Live
|Best Rock Gospel Album
|
|-
|2002
|Down in the Alley
|Best Traditional Blues Album
|
|-
|2010
|"Misery"
|Best Pop Performance By A Duo Or Group With Vocals
|
|-
|rowspan="3"|2011
|"Moves like Jagger"
|Best Pop Duo/Group Performance
|
|-
|Paper Airplane
|Best Bluegrass Album
|
|-
|Paper Airplane
|Best Engineered Album, Non-Classical
|
|-
|rowspan="2"|2012
|"When Mercy Found Me"
|Best Contemporary Christian Music Song
|
|-
|Hambone’s Meditations
|Best Folk Album
|
|-
|2013
|"Brave"
|Best Pop Solo Performance
|
|-
|2014
|Shine for All the People
|Best Roots Gospel Album
|
|-
|2015
|"512"
|Best Metal Performance
|
|-
|2016
|Blues & Ballads (A Folksinger’s Songbook)
|Best Traditional Blues Album
|
|-
|2019
|Deeper Roots: Where the Bluegrass Grows
|Best Roots Gospel Album
|
|-
|2022
|"Distance"
|Best Rock Song
|
|}

References

External links
 Euphonic Masters 

Living people
Year of birth missing (living people)
American audio engineers
Grammy Award winners
Mastering engineers